This is a list of local Presbyterian churches that are notable either as congregations or as buildings. For Presbyterian denominations, see List of Presbyterian denominations.

Asia

India

Israel/Palestine

Singapore

South Korea

Europe

The Netherlands

Italy

United Kingdom

England

Scotland

Ireland

North America

Canada

United States 

In the United States, many Presbyterian churches are notable for their active and large congregations, for their age, for their size, or for the architecture of their buildings. Many are listed on the National Register of Historic Places (NRHP) or on state and local historic registers. Some have been designated as National Historic Landmarks (NHL).

Oceania

Australia

New Zealand

South America

Brazil

References 

Presbyterian
Presbyterian church buildings